USS Oriole (MHC-55) was an  of the United States Navy. She was built by Intermarine USA and launched in 1993 then commissioned in 1995. After only eleven years of service she was decommissioned in 2006 and sold to Taiwan. She now operates as ROCS Yung Jin (MHC-1310).

References

 

1993 ships
Osprey-class coastal minehunters
Ships transferred from the United States Navy to the Republic of China Navy
Ships built in Louisiana